The 1988 Wyoming Cowboys football team represented the University of Wyoming in the 1988 NCAA Division I-A football season. It was the Cowboys' 93rd season and they competed as a member of the Western Athletic Conference (WAC). The team was led by head coach Paul Roach, in his second year, and played their home games at War Memorial Stadium in Laramie, Wyoming.  The Cowboys won the first 10 games of the season, with an average margin of victory of 30 points, claiming the WAC championship with an undefeated 8–0 record, and reaching a #10 ranking in the national AP poll.  However, the season ended with two disastrous losses in the last three games, including a 62–14 rout by Oklahoma State (led by Heisman Trophy winner Barry Sanders) in the Holiday Bowl. The Cowboys offense scored 511 points, while the defense allowed 280 points.

Schedule

Reference:

1989 NFL Draft
The following were selected in the 1989 NFL Draft.

References

Wyoming
Wyoming Cowboys football seasons
Western Athletic Conference football champion seasons
Wyoming Cowboys football